Trick or Treat Scooby-Doo! is a 2022 American animated direct-to-video supernatural comedy mystery film produced by Warner Bros. Animation and distributed by Warner Bros. Home Entertainment. It is the thirty-seventh direct-to-video Scooby-Doo film and was released digitally on October 4, 2022, and was released on DVD on October 18, 2022.

Premise 
Mystery Incorporated are summoned to a Nepal ski resort under siege by a cat monster. After the gang captures it by triggering an avalanche, it's revealed to be one of the owners of the resort, trying to keep her step-mother out of the business. Mystery Inc. takes and analyzes a whisker from the cat costume, learning that it is made with the same materials as costumes used by villains in their previous mysteries. They determine that the costumes were made by the same person, Coco Diablo, a high-end Halloween costume designer. Scooby Doo and Shaggy disguise themselves as potential buyers and after Coco offers to give them a costume if they kill the mystery gang, she is caught and sent to prison.

A year passes with Fred, Daphne and Velma growing more depressed by the lack of truly difficult mysteries, while Shaggy and Scooby are having a much better time for they were able relax due to the lack of danger. After solving a tax scheme, only for the perpetrator to get away with it, Fred makes a wish in a wishing well for more mysteries. 

The gang attends a local carnival and are attacked by a ghost that resembles Fred and blows up the Mystery Machine. They go to Coolsville Penitentiary to interview Coco and meet the warden, who allows Coco to leave with them. 

After finding a clue at the carnival in the remains of their booth, they do research at the local library. At the library, they are attacked by ghosts but escape and confront Trevor at his new shop when Coco determines that the costumes matched his style of design. 

Trevor reveals that he sent four costumes of Victorian-era style to Coolsville Penitentiary, and the gang discoverers that Coco broke her heart monitor and escaped. They follow her to her factory and trap the ghosts with the alligator pit, revealing that the ghosts are robots in costumes. 

Coco offers a false confession, but the gang sees through it and determines that the warden is holding Esteban hostage and is behind the whole thing. He confesses and is arrested, but when trying to assure Mystery Inc. that they were never in any real danger, he accidentally releases all the inmates at the penitentiary. They escape, and to round them up, the gang dresses up in costumes of criminals from their past cases. After re-capturing the inmates, Shaggy and Scooby reluctantly return the candy the inmates stole to the trick-or-treaters and Trevor gives them a large bag of candy while reveals himself to be a surfer using a disguise while Coco willingly returns to prison.

Cast 
Frank Welker as Scooby-Doo, Fred Jones, Rudy, Count Nefario
Grey DeLisle as Daphne Blake, Daisy, Musketeer #1, Olive
Matthew Lillard as Shaggy Rogers, Craggly, Captain Cutler
Kate Micucci as Velma Dinkley, Helga
Myrna Velasco as Coco Diablo
Dee Bradley Baker as Esteban, Mr. Wickles, Cat Man
Jeff Bennett as Charlie Humdrum, Hank
Anthony Carrigan as Trevor Glume
Erin Fitzgerald as Library Kid, Superhero Girl, Musketeer #2
David Lodge as Warden Collins, Harry the Hypnotist, Mayor Dudley 
Lara Jill Miller as Prisoner Costume Teen, Superhero Boy, Musketeer #3
Candi Milo as Alice Dovely, Dinosaur Kid, Monster Kid
Jenelle Lynn Randall as Librarian, Superboy
Kevin Michael Richardson as Sheriff, Henry Bascombe, 10,000 Volt Ghost

Music 
The film's original score was composed by Ryan Shore.

Release 
Trick or Treat Scooby-Doo! was released digitally on October 4, 2022, and is was released on DVD on October 18, 2022, by Warner Bros. Home Entertainment (through Studio Distribution Services).

The film made its TV premiere on Cartoon Network on October 14, 2022, at 7pm ET/PT, and then streaming on HBO Max the next day.

Reception 
In a review for Autostraddle, Heather Hogan called the film "A very funny movie for people who grew up on Scooby-Doo." Overall, the film has  three reviews on the review aggregation website Rotten Tomatoes, although it also received a 50% rotten score from audiences.

Depiction of Velma Dinkley 

Trick or Treat Scooby-Doo! made headlines for depicting Velma Dinkley "crushing big time" on female character Coco Diablo, in accordance with long-held fan speculation that Velma was a lesbian/bisexual, a concept previously considered for depiction in the first theatrical live-action Scooby-Doo film Scooby-Doo (2002) and the TV series Scooby-Doo! Mystery Incorporated (2010–2013). Lesbian actress Hayley Kiyoko, who played Velma in the direct-to-video live-action Scooby-Doo films directed by Brian Levant, said she was "happy for her". In response to speculation that Trick or Treat would lead to Velma being depicted as a lesbian in all subsequent Scooby-Doo media, Mindy Kaling clarified on International Lesbian Day that Velma would not be depicted as such in her upcoming adult-oriented metafictional HBO Max series Velma, instead involved in a "love quadrangle" with Fred, Daphne, and Shaggy, specifically with a crush on Fred.

References

External links 

2020s English-language films
2020s American animated films
2020s children's animated films
Films based on television series
Warner Bros. Animation animated films
Warner Bros. direct-to-video animated films
2022 direct-to-video films
2022 animated films
2022 films
Films about Halloween
American children's animated mystery films
American children's animated comedy films
American mystery films
Scooby-Doo direct-to-video animated films
American direct-to-video films
American comedy horror films
American films about Halloween
Films produced by Sam Register
Films scored by Ryan Shore
2022 comedy films
LGBT-related animated films
2022 LGBT-related films